Letter 1949 is a 2008 Taiwanese drama starring Queenie Tai, Lin Yo-wei, Alien Huang, Hawick Lau. It was produced by Eastern Shine Production. The series was broadcast on free-to-air Chinese Television System (CTS) from 9 to 26 November 2008, Monday to Thursday at 20:00.

In 2010 Chang Chen-kuang was nominated for Best Supporting Actor and Chang Yu-ao was nominated for Best Art and Design Award at the 45th Golden Bell Awards.

Synopsis
In 2009, 80-year-old former journalist Lin Xiang refuses to move out of his old home earmarked for demolition. Lin Xiang after much persuasion by his students finally provided an old photo of his for an 'Old Shanghai' photo exhibition. The exhibition arrives in Taipei, Han Zu Guang takes his wife, Qiao Yan Qing, to see it at the invitation of a former colleague. At the exhibition Qiao Yan Qing faints at seeing Lin Xiang's photo of herself taken in 1949, who has been waiting for her for 60 years ...

Cast
Queenie Tai as Han Wei in 2009 / Qiao Yan Qing in 1949
 as Qiao Yan Qing in 2009
 as Tang Xuan in 2009 / Tang Hao Yiin 1949
Chang Chen-kuang as Tang Hao Yi in 2009
Alien Huang as Li Wen Xiong in 2009
Hawick Lau as Lin Xiang in 1949
Huang Xiao Li as Lin Xiang in 2009
Jack Li as Han Zu Guang in 1949
Ku Pao-ming as Han Zu Guang in 2009
Yue Yao Li as Tang Fei in 1949

2009
Renzo Liu as Han Ben Li 
Xie Qiong Nuan as Fan Chun Mei 
Gao Zhen Peng as Lao Fang
Ivy Yin as Yun Ji 
Matt Wu as Edward
Maggie Wu as Mo Sheng Sheng
Lu Yi Long as Zhang Xing Hua 
Chu Lu-hao as Lao Ma 
Zhong Xin Ling as Xiao Pang 
Qiu Xiu Min as Lin Zhi Zi 
Cai Ming Yi as A Yuan 
Liu Yi Ling as A May
Zhang Ling as Mary
Li Zhuo as Kenny
Lei Jun Kai as Xiao Lei 
Wu Pei Qi as News anchor
Guan Xin as Tang Hao Yi's secretary
Sun Hui Ting as Tang Xuan's secretary
Can Wei Yi as Nick
Zhang Jun as Dong Yi Jun 
Huang Zhi Rong as gallery guard

1949 Taiwan
Lin Mei-hsiu as Lin Xiang's mother
Di Zhi Jie as Xiao Fang 
Jag Huang as Xiao Ma 
Qiu Yi Feng as Zhang Xing Hua 
Wu Yi Ting as Jiao Min 
Chen Ji Ping as Jiao Zong 
Lu Xiao Qing as Lin Zhi Zi 
Yan Sheng Yu as robber
Deng Sheng Yao as servant

1949 Shanghai
Danny Dun as Editor Zhao 
Chen Xiao Ping as Chu Yan Ling 
Li Bing Bing as A Si 
Zhou Xiao Hai as Lao Xu 
Li Quan You as Xiao Gao 
Chen Ze Lin as Xiao Bao 
Xu Shou Qin as Gao An Ming 
Zhu Ying as Miss Xu 
Zhao Ming Yu as Tailor Wang 
An De Lie as Western waiter

Credits
Producer: Liang Han Hui, Xu Zhi Yi, Gao Qi Fang 
Director: Chen Ming Zhang, Danny Dun
Screenwriter: Wu Luo Ying, Wu Wei Jun, Zhang Wei Ting, Yang Jing Xiang, Pan Guan Hong

References

External links
 Eastern Shine Production
 CTS Letter 1949 website
 Letter 1949 Blog

Taiwanese drama television series
Chinese Television System original programming
Television shows written by Luo Ying Wu